Manolina Konstantinou (born April 10, 1993 in Limassol, Cyprus) is a Cypriot female professional volleyball player, who has been a member of the Cyprus women's national volleyball team. Konstantinou is also an accomplished beach volley player and won the silver medal at the 2017 Games of the Small States of Europe along with teammate Mariota Angelopoulou.

Sporting achievements

National championships
 2012/2013  Greek Championship, with Olympiacos Piraeus
 2013/2014  Greek Championship, with Olympiacos Piraeus
 2014/2015  Greek Championship, with Olympiacos Piraeus
 2015/2016  Greek Championship, with Olympiacos Piraeus
 2021/2022  Greek Championship, with Panathinaikos

National cups
 2012/2013  Greek Cup, with Olympiacos Piraeus
 2013/2014  Greek Cup, with Olympiacos Piraeus
 2014/2015  Greek Cup, with Olympiacos Piraeus
 2015/2016  Greek Cup, with Olympiacos Piraeus
 2021/2022  Greek Cup, with Panathinaikos

Individuals
 2012/2013 Greek Cup MVP

References

External links
 
 profile at greekvolley.gr 
 profile at CEV web site at cev.lu

Panathinaikos Women's Volleyball players
Olympiacos Women's Volleyball players
Cypriot women's volleyball players
1993 births
Living people
Commonwealth Games competitors for Cyprus
Beach volleyball players at the 2018 Commonwealth Games
Outside hitters
Cypriot expatriates in Greece
Expatriate volleyball players in Greece
Competitors at the 2018 Mediterranean Games
Mediterranean Games competitors for Cyprus